Stylochidae is a family of polyclad flatworms. It includes the species Stylochus zebra, which usually lives in shells occupied by the hermit crab Pagurus pollicaris, though it can sometimes be found free living on rocks and pilings.

The family contains the following 6 genera containing 36 accepted species:

Cryptostylochus
Cryptostylochus coseirensis
Cryptostylochus hullensis
Cryptostylochus koreensis
Distylochus
Distylochus isifer
Distylochus martae
Distylochus pusillus
Kataria
Kataria gloriosa
Leptostylochus
Leptostylochus capensis
Leptostylochus elongatus
Leptostylochus gracilis
Leptostylochus novacambrensis
Leptostylochus pacificus
Leptostylochus palombii
Leptostylochus polysorus
Stylochopsis
Stylochopsis ellipticus
Stylochopsis ponticus
Stylochus
Stylochus alexandrinus
Stylochus argus
Stylochus bermudensis
Stylochus cinereus
Stylochus conglomeratus
Stylochus crassus
Stylochus ellipticus
Stylochus flevensis
Stylochus frontalis
Stylochus limosus
Stylochus luteus
Stylochus mediterraneus
Stylochus neapolitanus
Stylochus pillidum
Stylochus plessissii
Stylochus pygmaeus
Stylochus teuricus
Stylochus vesiculatus
Stylochus zanzibaricus
Stylochus zebra

References

Turbellaria